Broad Haven is a village and seaside resort in the south east corner of St Bride's Bay at the western terminus of the B4341 road in south Pembrokeshire, Wales.

Broad Haven and Little Haven together form the Havens community and division of Pembrokeshire County Council. The 2001 census records a population of 1,328 for the Havens. The only church in Broad Haven is the Baptist church, although there are Anglican churches in nearby Little Haven.

It is a seaside resort with a large west-facing Blue Flag beach offering safe bathing for families and good surfing, windsurfing and sailing opportunities. The north end of Broad Haven beach has a number of interesting geological features including folding, a stack (locally known as Lion Rock) and natural arches. The town has a number of restaurants and pubs including The Galleon Inn and The Ocean. Broad Haven should not to be confused with the Broad Haven South beach near Bosherston in south Pembrokeshire.

History
Little is known of the origins of the village but it has been known as a seaside resort since the 1800s. A RNLI lifeboat was stationed at Little Haven from 1882 to 1921. In 1967 the station was reopened with an inshore lifeboat, with the name changed to Little and Broad Haven Lifeboat Station.

Welsh Triangle-Broad Haven-Dyfed Triangle
In 1977 the area was the scene of alleged UFO sightings and nicknamed the Welsh Triangle, Broad Haven Triangle or Dyfed Triangle in the manner of the Bermuda Triangle. On 4 February 1977, a yellow cigar-shaped craft was claimed to have landed in a field next to Broadhaven Primary School, with a group of 14 children claiming to have observed the craft and a silver creature. On 17 February 1977, the same craft was claimed to have been seen by teachers at the school and other witnesses. On 19 April 1977, the owner of the Haven Fort Hotel in Little Haven claims to have seen an 'upside-down saucer' in a neighbouring field and two humanoid creatures. An investigator from the Ministry of Defence was unable to find any evidence of such a landing, and further speculated that "a local prankster" might have been involved.

References

External links 

 www.geograph.co.uk : photos of Broad Haven, Pembrokeshire and surrounding area
 Broad Haven Baptist Church
 Broad Haven Triangle

Beaches of Pembrokeshire
Coast of Pembrokeshire
Villages in Pembrokeshire